The 1991 NCAA men's volleyball tournament was the 22nd annual tournament to determine the national champion of NCAA men's collegiate volleyball. The tournament was played at the Neal S. Blaisdell Center in Honolulu, Hawaiʻi during May 1991.

Long Beach State defeated USC in the final match, 3–1 (15–6, 15–11, 8–15, 15–8), to win their first national title. The 49ers (31–4) were coached by Ray Ratelle. This was a rematch of the previous year's final, won by USC.

Long Beach State's Brent Hilliard was named the tournament's Most Outstanding Player. Hilliard, along with five other players, comprised the All-Tournament Team.

Qualification
Until the creation of the NCAA Men's Division III Volleyball Championship in 2012, there was only a single national championship for men's volleyball. As such, all NCAA men's volleyball programs, whether from Division I, Division II, or Division III, were eligible. A total of 4 teams were invited to contest this championship.

Tournament bracket 
Site: Neal S. Blaisdell Center, Honolulu, Hawaiʻi

All tournament team 
Brent Hilliard, Long Beach State (Most outstanding player)
Brett Winslow, Long Beach State
Jason Stimpfig, Long Beach State
Alan Knipe, Long Beach State
Matt Lyles, Long Beach State
Bryan Ivie, USC

See also 
 NCAA Men's National Collegiate Volleyball Championship
 NCAA Women's Volleyball Championships (Division I, Division II, Division III)

References

1991
NCAA Men's Volleyball Championship
NCAA Men's Volleyball Championship
1991 in sports in Hawaii
Volleyball in Hawaii